Missouri Day is an observance in the U.S. state of Missouri, currently held on the third Wednesday in October. Originally on the first Monday in October, it was moved to the third Wednesday in 1969. Created by House Bill 122 in 1915, Missouri Day is set aside to "foster love for our state’s history and to teach rising generations of boys and girls the glories of Missouri." 

The inspiration for the day came from native Missourian and schoolteacher Anna Lee Brosius Korn. Having composed the former state song, "Missouri", she felt the state needed an entire day to recognize significant Missourians. Korn later, after moving to Oklahoma, founded Oklahoma Day as well as the Oklahoma Hall of Fame. 

Though an established day, little observance is carried out in the state. While he was a State Senator, Jason Glennon Crowell had acknowledged that the day does not garner as much attention as days such as Independence Day, and some in the state have become critical of its ambiguous October observance. For over a decade, activist F. Spencer Hunley has lobbied for a concrete date, May 8, President Harry S. Truman's birthday. During that time, the change has been proposed three times before the state legislature, failing to leave committee.

External links
 Missouri symbols
 Missouri Revised Statutes
 Remembering Missouri Day:A column by Secretary of State Robin Carnahan

Missouri culture
State holidays in the United States
Holidays and observances by scheduling (nth weekday of the month)
October observances